Wesley Malcolm is a former West Indian cricket umpire. He stood in two Test matches between 1978 and 1983 and one ODI game in 1978.

See also
 List of Test cricket umpires
 List of One Day International cricket umpires

References

Year of birth missing (living people)
Living people
Place of birth missing (living people)
West Indian Test cricket umpires
West Indian One Day International cricket umpires